The 1985 NCAA Division I Men's Soccer Tournament was the 26th organized men's college soccer tournament by the National Collegiate Athletic Association, to determine the top college soccer team in the United States.

The UCLA Bruins won their first national title by defeating the American Eagles in the championship game, 1–0, after eight overtime periods. The final match was played on December 14, 1985, in Seattle, Washington, at the Kingdome for the second straight year.

Early rounds

Final 
This game is the longest game in NCAA soccer history, with the winning goal scored at 166 minutes and 5 seconds of playing time. After this game and the 1982 final both went to eight overtimes, the NCAA changed the rules for the 1986 season from unlimited 10-minute overtimes to a maximum of two 30-minute periods divided into halves.

See also  
 NCAA Division II Men's Soccer Championship
 NCAA Division III Men's Soccer Championship
 NAIA Men's Soccer Championship

References 

NCAA Division I Men's Soccer Tournament seasons
NCAA
Soccer in Seattle
Sports competitions in Seattle
December 1985 sports events in the United States
1980s in Seattle
1985 in sports in Washington (state)